Hugh Jackson Lawlor  (11 December 1860 – 26 December 1938) was an Irish Anglican priest  and author. He is best remembered for his term as Dean of St Patrick’s Cathedral, Dublin.

Hugh Jackson Lawlor was born in Ballymena, Co Antrim.  He was educated at Drogheda Grammar School, Rathmines School, Dublin and Trinity College Dublin from where he graduated with BA in mathematics in 1882, getting his MA in 1885. For a while in the 1880s, he was an examiner in mathematics for the Intermediate Board of Education. He was a curate at Christ Church, Kingstown (modern day Dunleary) from 1885 to 1893 then an assistant to Archbishop King’s Lecturer in Divinity at the University of Dublin. He was Senior Chaplain of St Mary’s Cathedral, Edinburgh from 1893 to 1898 and then Professor of Ecclesiastical History at the University of Dublin. From 1924 until his retirement in 1933 he served as the (Church of Ireland) Dean of St Patrick’s Cathedral, Dublin.

References

External links
 
 
 

1860 births
People educated at Drogheda Grammar School
People educated at Rathmines School
Alumni of Trinity College Dublin
Irish Anglicans
Deans of St. Patrick's Cathedral, Dublin
1938 deaths